Casummit Creek is a creek in Kenora District, Ontario, Canada. There are three tributaries, all unnamed creeks, two from the left and one from the right. A portage leads from Birch Lake to just west of the Casummit Creek source point.

See also
List of rivers of Ontario

References

Rivers of Kenora District